Slowworms (also called blindworms and hazelworms) are a small genus (Anguis) of snake-like legless lizards in the family Anguidae. The genus has several living species, including the common slowworm, the eastern slowworm, the Greek slowworm, the Peloponnese slowworm, and the Italian slowworm (Anguis veronensis). There are also known fossil species.

Description
Slowworms are typically grey-brown, with the females having a coppery sheen and two lateral black stripes, and the males displaying electric blue spots, particularly in the breeding season.

Slowworms are slow-moving and can be easily caught, which has given rise to the folk etymology that the "slow" in slowworm is the same as the English adjective slow; the actual origin is a proto-Germanic root which simply means "slowworm" (cf. German Schleiche). Like many lizards, slowworms can shed their tails to distract predators. The tail regrows, but never fully. Principal predators are birds, badgers, hedgehogs, foxes and domestic cats.

The average British slowworm can grow to 45 cm when fully mature and weigh about 100 g, females being slightly larger than the males. The tail makes up around half its length, but is indistinguishable from the body.  It has been recorded to live for up to 30 years in wild, and the record age for a slowworm in captivity is 54 years (Copenhagen Zoo).

The specific name fragilis (fragile) comes from the tendency of this species to shed its own tail, when threatened by predators, or if handled too roughly (caudal autotomy).

Morphology
Although slowworms much resemble snakes, and are often mistaken for such, they are actually lizards that have lost their limbs completely with evolution.

Slowworms can be distinguished from snakes by several features: their eyelids, which snakes lack (having brille instead); their small ear openings, which again snakes lack; and their tongues, which are notched in the centre rather than completely forked like a snake's.

Habitat
Slowworms live in any habitat that is warm and protected, such as woodland, grassland, and heathland; they are frequently found in garden compost heaps, sometimes on purpose for pest control. They range across most of Europe, and into parts of Asia, but they are restricted to temperate and humid habitats. They hibernate from October to February/March, both communally and solitarily, and sometimes share hibernating sites with other reptiles.

Diet
Slowworms have grooved teeth which allow them to grab and swallow whole their soft invertebrate prey, such as slugs, hairless caterpillars, other insects, spiders, and earthworms. Snails are usually avoided, except when they are still very young and the shell can be broken easily.

Protected status
Slowworms are protected in the United Kingdom and Poland.

Classification

Subfamily Anguinae
Genus Anguis
Anguis cephallonica, Peloponnese slowworm – Werner, 1894
Anguis colchica, eastern slowworm – (Nordmann, 1840)
Anguis fragilis, common slowworm — Linnaeus, 1758
Anguis graeca, Greek slowworm – Bedriaga, 1881
Anguis veronensis, Italian slowworm — Pollini, 1818
Anguis rarus Klembara & Rummel, 2017
Anguis stammeri Brunner, 1957
Anguis polgardiensis Bolkay, 1913

Gvoždík et al. (2013) distinguished five genetic species of Anguis: graeca, colchica, fragilis, cinerea, and cephallonica, but a review of the genus has not yet been completed.

Extant species

References

External links

 

Anguis
Lizard genera
Taxa named by Carl Linnaeus

de:Blindschleiche